Sayyid Mohammad Sadeq Kharazi (born 2 March 1963) is a former Iranian diplomat and advisor to Iran's former President Khatami.

Kharazi started his career in 1983 during the Iran–Iraq War in the High Defence Council and the IRIB. He subsequently became Iran ambassador to the United Nations in 1989 and after a period of six years he returned to Iran as Deputy Foreign Minister for Research. He became Iran’s Ambassador to France in 2002 until 2006 when Mahmoud Ahmadinejad was elected into office. Kharazi was the chairman of the 1997 Tehran OIC Summit. He was also a key figure in the two-year nuclear negotiations with the EU trio.

Kharazi has a keen interest in calligraphic and historical manuscripts and is an avid collector of such items. He is a member of the board of several Iranian cultural, educational and research centers, including Tehran University, the Cultural Heritage Organization of Iran, and the National Library of Iran.

Currently, Kharazi works closely with Mohammad Khatami on the issue of dialogue amongst civilizations and is his senior advisor. He is the co- founder of the ‘Encyclopedia of Contemporary Islam’ that researches the cultural and political movements and schools of thought of Iran in the past two centuries. Additionally he is the founder and editor of the Iranian Diplomacy website, the Iranian Economy website and Heritage of Iran and Islam website.

References
 Transcript: Interview with Sadegh Kharrazi
 AsiaSource Financial, Inc.
 Former Ambassador Sadegh Kharazi Remarks on Iranian Presidential Elections

External links

Iranian diplomats
Permanent Representatives of Iran to the United Nations
Iranian Vice Ministers
Living people
Ambassadors of Iran to France
1963 births
NEDA Party politicians
Iranian news website owners (people)
Secretaries-General of political parties in Iran
Alumni of Durham University